The International Federation of Rabbis (IFR) was founded in 2000 as a Non-denominational organization for Jewish rabbis of all backgrounds.   It aims to provide a forum to explore Judaism's response to the changing needs of the modern era.  IFR provides members with various means to confer with and share ideas with colleagues around the world, such as its private list serve and quarterly newsletter.

IFR's rabbis have been noted within and outside of the Jewish community for the diverse backgrounds and perspectives they bring to Jewish pastoral care.

Conferences 

IFR hosts a biyearly conference for its members at which various topics in Jewish pastoral care and Torah scholarship are discussed.

References

Non-denominational Judaism
Rabbinical organizations
Jewish organizations established in 2000